The Warren Fox Building is a historic commercial building in Lowell, Massachusetts.  The four-story brick building was built in 1884 by Warren Fox, and is a good example of commercial Queen Anne architecture.  The building is nine bays wide; brick piers rise surrounding the central bay, where the main entrance is, and rise above the level of the flat roof to form a cornice.

The building was listed on the National Register of Historic Places in 1989; it was included in the bounds of the Lowell National Historical Park in 1978.

See also
National Register of Historic Places listings in Lowell, Massachusetts

References

Commercial buildings on the National Register of Historic Places in Massachusetts
Buildings and structures in Lowell, Massachusetts
National Register of Historic Places in Lowell, Massachusetts
Historic district contributing properties in Massachusetts